Ommatospila descriptalis is a moth in the family Crambidae. It was described by Francis Walker in 1866. It is found in the Dominican Republic.

References

Moths described in 1866
Spilomelinae